"Wanted Dead or Alive" is a collaboration song by 2Pac and Snoop Doggy Dogg released as the lead single from the soundtrack Gridlock'd.

Music video
The video showed the police trying to catch Snoop Dogg and clips of the deceased rapper Tupac Shakur. The storyline is similar to "2 of Amerikaz Most Wanted". The video is directed by Scott Kalvert and the track samples Dance Floor by Zapp & Roger.

Track listing 
12-inch single
 Wanted Dead or Alive — 4:42
 Never Had A Friend Like Me — 4:26
 Life Is a Traffic Jam — 4:22

Personnel
 Tupac – Primary Artist
 Snoop Doggy Dogg – Primary Artist
 DJ Pooh – Producer

Charts

References

1996 songs
1997 singles
Snoop Dogg songs
Tupac Shakur songs
Songs released posthumously
Gangsta rap songs
Songs written by Snoop Dogg
Interscope Records singles
Songs written by Tupac Shakur